David Goodwillie is an American novelist, memoirist and journalist. He has published three books: the novels Kings County and American Subversive, and the memoir Seemed Like a Good Idea at the Time.

Early life 

Goodwillie was born in Paris and grew up in London. Upon moving to the U.S., his family lived in Montclair, N.J., Baltimore, M.D., and Washington, D.C. He graduated from St. Georges School and Kenyon College, where he was captain of the baseball team and drafted to play professionally in 1994 by the Newark Buffalos of the Single-A Frontier League. After a short lived career, he moved to New York City, where he held several improbable jobs, including Private Investigator for Kroll Inc., Specialist in Charge at Sotheby's Auction House, and Internet entrepreneur. These and other adventures are chronicled in his first book, the 2006 memoir "Seemed Like a Good Idea at the Time."

Career 

Fiction

Goodwillie's debut novel, American Subversive, was published by Scribner in 2010. Hailed as "genuinely thrilling" by The New Yorker, and "a triumphant work of fiction" by the Associated Press, it was a New York Times Notable Book and Editors' Choice of 2010, and a Vanity Fair and Publishers Weekly top ten spring debut. Reviewing American Subversive for the Daily Beast, Claire Howorth called it, "A rare novel that gets the moment even as we're living it...A fast paced, engaging novel of pop culture and big ideas, authentically subversive, and thoroughly American."

His second novel, Kings County, sold to Simon & Schuster in September 2017, in what Publishers Marketplace described as a "significant deal". Published in 2020, it was a New York Times Editors' Choice and a finalist for the 2021 Gotham Book Prize. Reviewing Kings County in the New York Times, Adelle Waldman called it, "a suspenseful read...Goodwillie is a stylish writer, smart and witty without being a show-off...[His] characters are so likable, so sincere in their affection and decent in their moral decision making...A very good new novel." Kirkus called Kings County, "a captivatingly vivid portrait of young love in New York in the early 2000s [and]...a panoramic time capsule of youth and self-discovery...Goodwillie's writing is full of not only impressive detail and fondness, but also self-awareness...The novel's characterizations of people--from Brooklyn musicians to Upper East Siders--and the city itself are its biggest strength."

Nonfiction

Goodwillie's first book, the memoir Seemed Like a Good Idea at the time, was published by Algonquin Books in 2006. Written partly at the Chelsea Hotel, it tells the story of his knock-about journey through downtown Manhattan as he struggles to become a writer. The Louisville Courier-Journal called it a "mesmerizing memoir and searing sketch of a decade in decline...[Goodwillie] conveys his wisdom via syntax that is simultaneously sobering insightful and amusing." But Toby Young, in a Wall Street Journal take down, wrote that, "There were moments in this book when I wished [Goodwillie] hadn't given up his day job."

He has written several investigative features for national magazines, including a 2012 cover story on "Nuclear Divers" for Popular Science, and an exposé on the Italian Mafia's activities in Manhattan's garment trucking industry for the Fall 1997 issue of BlackBook magazine.

Goodwillie has written about books for The New York Times and The Daily Beast, and his fiction and nonfiction have appeared in New York Magazine, Newsweek, Popular Science, Men's Health, BlackBook, The New York Observer, The New York Post, The Rumpus, and Deadspin.

TV/Film

On April 6, 2022, The Hollywood Reporter announced that Kings County had been optioned as a TV Series by producers Lindsay Shookus and Jessie Creel, and is being adapted by Emmy and Peabody Award-winning writer Allison Silverman.

Personal life 

Goodwillie lives in Brooklyn, New York, and the Hudson Valley.

He has dated stage/screen actress Marin Ireland and actress KaDee Strickland.  He has also dated environmental activist Kick Kennedy.

References

External links

NYT Review of Kings County
USA Today Story about memoir writing, featuring David Goodwillie and his publisher, Algonquin.
Daily Beast review 
NPR coverage of American Subversive
NYT review of American Subversive
NYT Papercuts playlist
Chelsea Hotel interview
StackedUp TV episode

1972 births
Living people
Kenyon College alumni